El Kulzom or Al Qelzam (from ) is a village in the Qalyubia Governorate, Egypt.

Notable people
 Mor Augin, an Egyptian Coptic monk.

References

Populated places in Qalyubiyya Governorate